Phyllonorycter viburni is a moth of the family Gracillariidae. It is known from the islands of Honshu, Shikoku and Kyushu in Japan.

The wingspan is 6.5-8.5 mm.

The larvae feed as leaf miners on Viburnum dilatatum, Viburnum erosum and Viburnum wrightii. The mine is ptychonomous and located in the space between two veins of the lower surface of the leaf.

References

viburni
Moths of Japan
Moths described in 1963
Taxa named by Tosio Kumata
Leaf miners